Orthogonia plana is a moth of the family Noctuidae. It was first described by John Henry Leech in 1900. It is found in China.

References

Xyleninae